Douglas Vincent (born 2 September 1954) was a Scottish cricketer. He was a right-handed batsman who played for Cambridgeshire. He was born in Glasgow.

Vincent, who played in the Minor Counties Championship for the team for the first time in 1982, made his only List A appearance in the NatWest Trophy competition of 1986, against Yorkshire. From the lower-middle order, he scored 6 runs.

External links
Douglas Vincent at Cricket Archive 

1954 births
Living people
Scottish cricketers
Cambridgeshire cricketers
Cricketers from Glasgow